Edward Henry Fitzpartrick (December 9, 1889 – October 23, 1965) was a Major League Baseball player. He played three seasons for the Boston Braves from  until , mostly at second base or right field.

Sources

Major League Baseball second basemen
Major League Baseball outfielders
Boston Braves players
Lancaster Red Roses players
Toronto Maple Leafs (International League) players
Salt Lake City Bees players
Baseball players from Pennsylvania
1889 births
1965 deaths
Nazareth (minor league baseball) players